Göynükören can refer to:

 Göynükören, Bayramören
 Göynükören, Devrekani, a village in Turkey
 Göynükören, Gerede, a village in Turkey